The Outer Ring Road System, or more commonly known as ORRS, is a network of major arterial roads in Singapore that forms a ring road through the towns along the city fringe. The ORRS is a semi-expressway, just like the West Coast Highway. Since 1994, roads along the ORRS have been upgraded in stages to provide a smoother route to travel across the island. Roads and interchanges along the ORRS are constantly being upgraded to cater to the ever increasing traffic demand. It starts as Portsdown Avenue in Queenstown and ends as Tampines Avenue 10 in Tampines. The series of roads passes through the areas of Queenstown, Bukit Timah, Central Catchment Nature Reserve, Bishan, Toa Payoh, Geylang and Tampines.

Route
The route of the ORRS forms a semi-circle shape, connecting several expressways and major arterial roads. Travelling from west to east in a clockwise direction, the route begins at Queenstown with a connection to the Ayer Rajah Expressway. The route continues northward through the residential areas of Bukit Timah via Farrer Road and Adam Road, with the first connection to the Pan Island Expressway. The route continues east through Bukit Brown, Toa Payoh, Bishan and Bartley, via the MacRitchie Viaduct and Lornie Viaduct and a connection to the Central Expressway. From here, the route travels eastwards to Kaki Bukit and Tampines through a series of viaducts.

Benefit
With the ORRS, traffic volume on city-bound roads will be reduced. It also provides an alternative route east-west travel for motorists without going through the city. Since ORRS is extensively linked to expressways and other arterial roads, such as Bukit Timah Road, motorists can get from one traffic route to another easily.

Upgrading projects
The first upgrading project started in 1994, with two intersections along Farrer Road being the first to be upgraded. The upgrading projects had to be carried out in stages to minimise disruption to traffic. The completion of the Portsdown Flyover, Queensway Flyover and Queensway Underpass marks another milestone in the realisation of the ORRS. The Farrer Road section of the upgrading project completed in 2009.

Interchange along ORRS

: Only expressways, arterial roads and major roads will be mentioned. Minor roads will not be mentioned.

See also
 Expressways of Singapore
 West Coast Highway, Singapore
 Nicoll Highway

References
 Outer Ring Road System (ORRS)
 Opening Of Extension Of Queensway To The AYE And Queensway/Commonwealth Avenue Interchange
 Speech by Mrs Lim Hwee Hua, Minister of State for Transport and Finance, at the opening of the extension of Queensway to Ayer Rajah Expressway and Queensway Underpass on Saturday, 13 August 2005, 9.15 am
 Braddell Road/Thomson Road/Lornie Road Flyover to open in July

Roads in Singapore
Ring roads